Tim Dutton (born 1967) is a British stage, film, and television actor. Dutton's films include Darkness Falls (1999), The Bourne Identity (2002), The Infiltrator (2016) and The Detonator. He starred in the Academy Award and BAFTA nominated movie Tom & Viv (1994) as Maurice Haigh-Wood.

Dutton grew up in Stratford-upon-Avon, Warwickshire. He read Law at Wolverhampton University and gained an LL.B with Honours before turning to acting.

Dutton played Mark Owens in Soldier, Soldier, Donna Tucker's tutor and lover (4 episodes, 1994). He had a recurring role in the Fox television series Ally McBeal as Brian Selig, a love interest of Calista Flockhart’s title character. He played D.S. Bailey for two seasons (1992-93) in "The Inspector Alleyn Mysteries." He also starred in the short-lived but critically acclaimed CBS sitcom about the Pilgrims in Plymouth Colony, Thanks which Entertainment Weekly called "the funniest new sitcom of the [1999–2000] season,"  with the Pulitzer Prize for Criticism winner LA Times writer Howard Rosenberg praising Duttons ‘’comic timing and overall terrific flair for humor’’. 
He made an appearance in the Press Gang episode "Chance is a Fine Thing" as Clark Kent, Judy's jealous boyfriend. He has worked twice with the writer Alan Bleasdale, starring in Melissa with Jenifer Ehle (1997) and Oliver Twist (1999). In 2001 he starred in the ABC comedy pilot H.M.O. with John Cleese, playing two ex-pat surgeons in a LA hospital. He played Simon Aston in “The Great and the Good”, S2:E4 of Lewis (2008).
In 2010 he produced and starred in The Rendezvous.
He has twice starred with the  actress, Tara Fitzgerald, in director Ferdinand Fairfax's Frenchman’s Creek (1998) and In the Name of Love (1999). 

In 2019 he played the series uber-villain and ‘God Father of Bethnal Green’ Joseph Merceron In the BBC series Poldark. “Joseph Merceron was utterly, utterly vile and utterly without mercy. He appeared to have no kind conscience, no morality.  I personally think he’s actually the worst Poldark villain of them all!”( Debbie Horsfield BBC Poldark series writer)

His Theatre credits include plays in the West End (London Assurance), Chichester Festival Theatre (Loves Labour’s Lost, Victory), The Royal Exchange Manchester (She’s in Your Hands), twice working with director Sam Mendes.

Dutton made a major stage appearance in 2014 in Headlong's highly acclaimed production of ‘’1984’’ directed by Robert Icke, at the Almeida and later in the West End and Internationally. He played the false friend and Party apparatchik, O'Brien. For which he won Best Featured Actor, Broadway World, Los Angeles Awards.

Filmography

References

External links

1964 births
English male film actors
English male television actors
Living people
People from Stratford-upon-Avon
Date of birth missing (living people)